Little Creek is an unincorporated community in Haralson County, in the U.S. state of Georgia.

History
A post office called Little Creek was established in 1876, and remained in operation until 1900. The community takes its name from a nearby stream of the same name.

References

Unincorporated communities in Haralson County, Georgia